Dendrobium brevicaudum, commonly known as the Mount Finnigan pencil orchid, is an epiphytic or lithophytic orchid in the family Orchidaceae and is endemic to  Queensland. It has hanging stems, cylindrical leaves and groups of about six yellowish or orange-brown flowers with red streaks and a white labellum. It is only known from two mountainous areas north of Cairns.

Description
Dendrobium brevicaudum is an epiphytic or lithophytic herb with pendulous stems and leaves. The side lobes are triangular and upright and the middle lobe is very wavy with three dark red ridges along its midline. Flowering occurs from December to January.

Taxonomy and naming
Dendrobium brevicaudum was first formally described in 1994 by David Jones and Mark Clements from a specimen collected on Mount Finnigan in the Ngalba Bulal National Park. The specific epithet (brevicaudum) is derived from the Latin words brevis meaning "short" and cauda meaning "tail" referring to the short tip of the labellum.

Distribution and habitat

References

brevicaudum
Orchids of Queensland
Endemic orchids of Australia
Plants described in 1994